Mansfield District Council elections are held every four years. Mansfield District Council is the local authority for the non-metropolitan district of Mansfield in Nottinghamshire, England. Since 2002 Mansfield has also had a directly elected mayor. Since the last boundary changes in 2011, 36 councillors have been elected from 36 wards. New ward boundaries are due to come into force for the 2023 election.

Political control
From 1891 until 1974 Mansfield was a municipal borough. Under the Local Government Act 1972 Mansfield became a non-metropolitan district and had its territory enlarged to also include Mansfield Woodhouse and Warsop. The first election to the reconstituted council was held in 1973, initially operating as a shadow authority before coming into its powers on 1 April 1974. Since 1973 political control of the council has been held by the following parties:

Leadership

Prior to 2002, political leadership was provided by the leader of the council. In 2002 the council changed to having a directly elected mayor. The mayors since 2002 have been:

Council elections
1973 Mansfield District Council election
1976 Mansfield District Council election
1979 Mansfield District Council election (New ward boundaries)
1983 Mansfield District Council election
1987 Mansfield District Council election
1991 Mansfield District Council election
1995 Mansfield District Council election (District boundary changes took place but the number of seats remained the same)
1999 Mansfield District Council election
2003 Mansfield District Council election (New ward boundaries)
2007 Mansfield District Council election
2011 Mansfield District Council election (New ward boundaries)
2015 Mansfield District Council election
2019 Mansfield District Council election

Mayoral elections
2002 Mansfield mayoral election
2007 Mansfield mayoral election
2011 Mansfield mayoral election
2015 Mansfield mayoral election
2019 Mansfield mayoral election

By-election results

1999–2003

2003–2007

2007–2011

2016

References

By-election results

External links
Mansfield District Council

 
Mansfield District
Council elections in Nottinghamshire
District council elections in England